James Thomas Obradovich (September 13, 1949 – March 3, 2012) was an American professional baseball player who appeared in ten Major League games for the Houston Astros in September of , mostly as a pinch hitter, but also as a first baseman.

A native of Fort Campbell, Kentucky, and the son of a military officer, Obradovich attended high school in Fort Knox, Kentucky, and signed with the Minnesota Twins in 1967 after being taken in the 24th round of the 1967 Major League Baseball Draft.  He missed the 1971 and 1972 minor league seasons while serving in Germany for the United States Army. He was in his tenth full professional baseball season when he was recalled by Houston in 1978, after he batted a career-high .306 with 21 home runs and 85 runs batted in for the Triple-A Charleston Charlies.

Obradovich started three games at first base for Houston during the season's final weeks. In 17 at bats, he collected three hits, including one triple — hit off eventual Hall of Famer Gaylord Perry of the San Diego Padres on September 16. The blow knocked in the only Astro run in a 2–1 defeat.

After spending the 1979 season at Charleston, he spent the next three seasons in the Mexican League before retiring.

References

 Jim Obradovich, aquel "gringo" de 1.90 de estatura que jugaba de primera base y que permaneció dos temporadas con el Riel (1980 y 1981)... Llegó a Aguascalientes luego de un breve paso por las Grandes Ligas con los Astros de Houston y de conquistar la Liga del Pacífico con los Mayos de Navojoa... Nunca lo vi jugar pero lo ubico perfecto como una de las personalidades y figuras que han construido la historia de la Máquina Ferrocarrilera...
Tal vez, lo más admirable de aquel hombre es que nunca se doblegó ante los horrores de la guerra, de una guerra de Vietnam bien conocida por haber visto miles de jóvenes en ambos bandos caer muertos o quedar imposibilitados para lo más elemental... Y quienes quedaron enteros, en su mayoría perecieron al poco tiempo aplastados por las adicciones, la amargura y la locura... Él no. 
Él sirvió a su país en esa maldita guerra, sobrevivió y regresó entero en todo el sentido de la palabra... Tan entero que estaba listo para retomar su pasión por el beisbol y hacerlo a nivel profesional; listo para regresar a la más noble y legítima de las batallas: la deportiva... Y Aguascalientes fue parte de ese bendito camino. 
En su lápida se lee: 
"James Thomas Obradovich. Sargento del Ejército de los Estados Unidos en Vietnam. Septiembre 13, 1949 - Marzo 3, 2012. Amado esposo e hijo, conectando home runs en el cielo".

Sources

1949 births
2012 deaths
Baseball players from Kentucky
Charleston Charlies players
Columbus Astros players
Gulf Coast Twins players
Houston Astros players
Lynchburg Twins players
Major League Baseball first basemen
Orlando Twins players
Savannah Braves players
Tacoma Twins players
St. Cloud Rox players
Piratas de Campeche players
Rieleros de Aguascalientes players
American expatriate baseball players in Mexico